The Battle of Niquitao was a part of the Venezuelan War of Independence which took place on July 2, 1813 in Boconó.

References

Niquitao
Trujillo (state)
July 1813 events
1813 in Venezuela